Carinamala is an extinct genus from a well-known class of fossil marine arthropods, the trilobites. It lived from 501 to 490 million years ago during the Dresbachian faunal stage of the late Cambrian Period.

References

Ptychoparioidea
Cambrian trilobites
Extinct animals of the United States
Ptychopariida genera